The 1906 season in Swedish football, starting January 1906 and ending December 1906:

Honours

Official titles

Competitions

Promotions, relegations and qualifications

Promotions

Relegations

Domestic results

Stockholmsserien klass 1 1906

Stockholmsserien klass 2 1906

Göteborgsserien klass I 1906 

Title-deciding match

Göteborgsserien klass II 1906

Svenska Mästerskapet 1906 
Final

Corinthian Bowl 1906 
Final

Kamratmästerskapen 1906 
Final

Wicanderska Välgörenhetsskölden 1906 
Final

Notes

References 
Print

Online

 
Seasons in Swedish football